Colonel Charles Edward ("Chuck") Jones (November 8, 1952 – September 11, 2001) was a United States Air Force officer, an aeronautical engineer, computer programmer, and an astronaut in the USAF Manned Spaceflight Engineer Program. He was killed during the September 11 attacks, aboard American Airlines Flight 11.

Life 
Charles Edward Jones was born November 8, 1952, in Clinton, Indiana. He graduated from Wichita East High School in 1970, earned a Bachelor of Science degree in Astronautical Engineering from the United States Air Force Academy in 1974, and received a Master of Science degree in Astronautics from Massachusetts Institute of Technology (MIT) in 1980. He entered the USAF Manned Spaceflight Engineer program in 1982, and was scheduled to fly on mission STS-71-B in December 1986, but the mission was canceled after the Challenger Disaster in January 1986. He left the Manned Spaceflight Engineer program in 1987.

He later worked for Defense Intelligence Agency (DIA), Bolling Air Force Base in Washington, D.C., and was Systems Program Director for Intelligence and Information Systems, Hanscom Air Force Base, Massachusetts.

He was killed at the age of 48 in the attacks of September 11, 2001, aboard American Airlines Flight 11. He had been living as a retired U.S. Air Force Colonel in Bedford, Massachusetts, at the time of his death. He was survived by his wife Jeanette.

At the National 9/11 Memorial, Jones is memorialized at the North Pool, on Panel N-74.

See also 

 Casualties of the September 11 attacks

References

Inline citations

General references
 "Astronaut Biography: Charles Jones" Space Facts, Retrieved June 24, 2013

1952 births
2001 deaths
American astronauts
American aerospace engineers
United States Air Force Academy alumni
MIT School of Engineering alumni
United States Air Force colonels
American Airlines Flight 11 victims
American terrorism victims
People murdered in New York City
Male murder victims
Terrorism deaths in New York (state)
People from Bedford, Massachusetts
People from Clinton, Indiana
20th-century American engineers
Military personnel from Massachusetts